Daniela Nadal Riquelme (born 14 November 1987) is a Mexican politician from the Institutional Revolutionary Party. From 2010 to 2012 she served as Deputy of the LXI Legislature of the Mexican Congress representing Veracruz.

References

1987 births
Living people
People from Córdoba, Veracruz
Politicians from Veracruz
Women members of the Chamber of Deputies (Mexico)
Institutional Revolutionary Party politicians
21st-century Mexican politicians
21st-century Mexican women politicians
Deputies of the LXI Legislature of Mexico
Members of the Chamber of Deputies (Mexico) for Veracruz